Kenneth Kaushansky, M.D., Master of the American College of Physicians (MACP) (born October 20, 1953) is an American medical doctor, hematologist, former editor of the medical journal Blood, and has served as the Dean of the Stony Brook University School of Medicine since July 2010. Prior to moving to Stony Brook, he was the Helen M. Ranney Professor, and Chair of the Department of Medicine at University of California, San Diego School of Medicine.

Early life and education
Kaushansky was born on October 20, 1953, in Montreal, Quebec, Canada. His father who "always wanted to be an American" migrated with the family to the United States, when Kaushansky was two years old. Kaushansky graduated from UCLA in 1975, summa cum laude and Phi Beta Kappa with a B.S. in biochemistry. He stayed at UCLA to obtain his medical degree in 1979. It was here that he met his future wife Lauren who was also at the time enrolled as a student at UCLA. As he left to join the University of Washington in Seattle to complete his internship and residency, Lauren enrolled for a Master's in Education at Antioch University in Seattle. Kaushansky was appointed Chief Resident at the Swedish Medical Center in Seattle, Washington, in 1982.
Describing himself as a "biochemist at heart", Kaushansky fell in love with hematology during his second year of residency. Curious about blood diseases and disorders, he chose to focus on the field during his fellowship between 1982 and 1986 at the University of Washington. His decision to pursue hematology was also influenced by the persuasive arguments of Dr. Clement Finch, the then Chief of Hematology at the University of Washington, who said "there is no other discipline in medicine where we know more about the biochemistry of disease than in hematology". In a Q&A session with the American Society of Hematology, Kaushansky recalled:

During his time in Seattle, he was honored with the NIH Physician Scientist Award in 1984, given to promising physician-scientists early in their careers. He was also awarded the junior faculty award by the American Cancer Society and was elected a member of the American Society for Clinical Investigation and the Association of American Physicians.

In 2002, Kaushansky was appointed as Chair and Helen M. Ranney Professor of the Department of Medicine at the University of California, San Diego. The Helen Ranney Chair in Medicine was the first research chair at the medical school named after a professor, the first endowed chair funded by the faculty, and the first endowed chair at UCSD named in honor of a woman professor. Helen Margaret Ranney was the first female president of Association of American Physicians, and her landmark research established one of the earliest links between genetic factors and sickle cell disease. On her demise in April 2010, Kaushansky (who had known her through his work in medical research) wrote, "Helen's career was marked by her intelligent approach to both clinical and research issues, her ability to achieve and inspire greatness, and her incredible wit".

Between 2003 and 2009, Kaushansky was named on the list of America's Top Doctors and San Diego's Top Doctors in Internal Medicine. In 2004, he was also elected a member to the prestigious Institute of Medicine of the National Academy of Sciences.

Kaushansky is a past-president of the American Society of Hematology (2007-2008), the American Society for Clinical Investigation (2004–2005) and the Western Society for Clinical Investigation (1998–1999). He also served a five-year term as Editor-in-Chief of the journal Blood (1998-2002) and as a major reviewer for the National Institutes of Health and many major scientific periodicals. Kaushansky has been recognized for his scientific and clinical contributions by election as a Master of the American College of Physicians, and to several honor societies and organizations, including the American Society for Clinical Investigation, the Association of American Physicians, the Institute of Medicine of the National Academies of Science and the American Academy of Arts and Sciences.

Work and research
In July 2010, Kaushansky was named the Senior Vice President for Health Sciences and the Dean of Stony Brook Medicine. He succeeded Dr. Richard N. Fine, who announced his intent to return to practicing pediatric nephrology in 2009. As Dean and Senior VP, Kaushansky oversees the education, clinical and research components of the School of Medicine and the Health Sciences, which include the School of Dental Medicine, School of Health Technology and Management, School of Nursing and the School of Social Welfare. He also has some oversight responsibility for Stony Brook University Medical Center, and oversight for the Long Island State Veterans Home. With 25 academic departments, 21 residency training programs and 27 fellowship training programs at Stony Brook Medicine, and as part of the only Academic Medical Center on Long Island, Dr. Kaushansky increased enrollment to help meet a growing need for physicians nationwide and welcomed 124 men and women to the class of 2012 – the largest incoming class ever. Stony Brook Medicine is also home to a $4 million, 6,000 square-feet Clinical Skills Center, a state-of-the art training center where medical students evaluate and diagnose patients through teaching modules that incorporate the use of actor patients and computerized mannequins that simulate characteristic disease conditions.

Kaushansky's appointment at Stony Brook was lauded by several academicians such as Eric W. Kaler the then Provost and Vice-President of Brookhaven Affairs at Stony Brook University and Dr. Edward J. Benz, the President of the Dana–Farber Cancer Institute and past president of the American Society of Hematology and the American Society for Clinical Investigation.

Kaushansky's lab at Stony Brook focuses on hematopoietic growth factors and the regulation of their gene expression. The lab also runs several projects to understand the physiology of megakaryotic developments and the tools necessary to perform gene therapy for bleeding disorders. Kaushansky has conducted seminal research on the molecular biology of blood cell production. As reported in journals such as Nature and The New England Journal of Medicine, his team has cloned several of the genes important in the growth and differentiation of blood cells, including thrombopoietin, a key regulator of stem cell and platelet production.
Thrombopoietin is the powerful hormone that the body uses to direct the bone marrow to produce platelets, the disk-like cells that are necessary for blood to clot.

In June 1994, the New York Times reported that Kaushansky along with a team from ZymoGenetics had found the mouse thrombopoietin gene, cloned it, produced recombinant hormone, demonstrated that it worked as expected in mice and then found the human hormone by looking for a human gene that resembled the mouse gene.
In recent years his group has established that thrombopoietin exerts a profound influence on hematopoietic stem cells, affects the expression of a number of transcription factors that influence stem cell fate decisions (HOXB4, HOXA9, c-Myb, HIF1A) and has unraveled the pathobiology of several congenital disorders of thrombopoiesis.

Kaushansky served as the editor-in-chief of the medical journal Blood for five years between 1997 and 2002. Just before assuming this position, he was awarded the William Damashek Prize. William Damashek was the founder of Blood and a renowned hematologist. The Damashek Prize is awarded annually to someone less than 50 years of age, who is deemed to have made "outstanding contributions" to hematology. In 2006 and 2007, Kaushansky was elected as a member the American Academy of Arts and Sciences, and honored as a Master of the American College of Physicians. He is also the former president of the American Society for Clinical Investigation and the American Society of Hematology.

Personal life
Kaushansky is married to Lauren Elizabeth Kaushansky and together they have two children, Alexis and Joshua Kaushansky. Alexis is a PhD molecular biologist and Joshua is an economist for the Massachusetts Department of Public Utilities based in Boston. Kaushansky and his wife reside in Eatons Neck, New York.

Professional societies and organizations
 American Federation for Medical Research
 American Society for Clinical Investigation
 Association of American Physicians
 Western Association of Physicians
 Institute of Medicine, National Academy of Sciences
 American College of Physicians
 American Academy of Arts and Sciences

Patents awarded
 US Patent #5,546,536: Inventors: Kaushansky K, Hagen FS. Colony-stimulating factor derivatives. 1988
 US Patent # 5,989,537: Inventors: Holly RD, Lok S, Foster DC, Kaushansky K, Kuijper JL, Lofton-Day CE, Oort PJ. Methods for stimulating granulocyte-macrophage lineage using thrombopoietin. 1999
 US Patent #6,099,830: Inventors: Kaushansky K. Methods for stimulating erythropoiesis using hematopoietic proteins. August 8, 2000
 Australian Patent #725159: Inventor: Kaushansky K. Methods for stimulating erythropoiesis using thrombopoietin. October 5, 2000
 Australian Patent #723793: Inventors: Holly RD, Lok S, Foster DC, Hagen FS, Kaushansky K, Kuijper JL, Lofton-Day CE, Oort PJ, Burkhead SK. Hematopoietic protein and materials and methods for making it. December 21, 2000
 US Patent #6,316,254: Inventors: Holly RD, Lok S, Foster DC, Kaushansky K, Kuijper JL, Lofton-Day CE, Oort PJ. Methods for stimulating erythropoiesis using hematopoietic proteins. November 13, 2001
 International Patent # WO 2004/026332A1: Kaushansky K, MacDonald B. Methods of increasing platelet and hematopoietic stem cell production. April 1, 2004.

Selected publications
 Kaushansky K, Lok S, Holly RD, Broudy VC, Lin N, Bailey MC, Forstrom JW, Buddle M, Oort PJ, Hagen FS, Roth GJ, Papayannopoulou Th, Foster DC:  Promotion of megakaryocyte progenitor expansion and differentiation by the c-Mpl ligand thrombopoietin.  Nature 369:568-571, 1994.
 Lok S, Kaushansky K, Holly RD, Kuijper JL, Lofton-Day CE, Oort PJ, Grant FJ, Heipel MD, Burkhead SK, Kramer JM, Bell LA, Sprecher CA, Blumberg H, Johnson R, Prunkard D, Ching AFT, Mathewes S, Bailey MC, Forstrom JW, Buddle MM, Osborn SG, Evans SJ, Sheppard PO, Presnell SR, O'Hara PJ, Hagen FS, Roth GJ., Foster DC:  Cloning and expression of murine thrombopoietin cDNA and stimulation of platelet production in vivo. Nature 369:565-568, 1994.
 Kaushansky K, Broudy VC, Lin N, Jorgensen MJ, McCarty J, Fox N, Zucker-Franklin D, Lofton-Day C: Thrombopoietin, the Mpl-ligand, is essential for full megakaryocyte development.  Proc. Natl. Acad. Sci. USA 92:3234-3238, 1995.
 Kaushansky K, Broudy, VC, Grossmann A, Humes J, Lin N, Ren H-P, Bailey MC, Papayannopoulou Th, Forstrom JW, Sprugel KH: Thrombopoietin expands erythroid progenitors, increases red cell production, and enhances erythroid recovery after myelosuppressive therapy.  J. Clin. Invest. 96:1683-1687, 1995.
 Fero ML, Rivkin M, Tasch M, Porter P, Carow CE, Firpo E, Polyak K, Tsai LH, Broudy VC, Perlmutter R, Kaushansky K, Roberts JM: A syndrome of gigantism, tumorigenesis and female sterility in p27Kip-1 deficient mice. Cell. 85:733-744, 1996.
 Kaushansky K, Shoemaker SG, O'Rork C, McCarty J:  The regulation of GM-CSF is dependent on a complex interplay of multiple nuclear regulatory proteins. Mol. Immunol. 33: 461–470, 1996.
 Kaushansky K: Thrombopoietin. Drug Therapy Series. The New England Journal of Medicine 339:746-754, 1998
 Parrish-Novak J, Dillon SR, Nelson A, Hammond A, Sprecher C, Gross JA, Johnston J, Madden K, Xu W, West J, Schrader S, Burkhead S, Heipel M, Brandt C, Kuijper J, Kramer J, Conklin D, Presnell SR, Berry J, Shiota F, Bort S, Hambly K, Mudri S, Clegg C, Moore M, Grant FJ, Lofton-Day C, Gilbert T, Raymond F, Ching A, Yao L, Smith D, Webster P, Whitmore T, Maurer M, Kaushansky K, Holly R, Foster D. Interleukin 21 and IL21R: A novel cytokine-receptor pair involved in NK cell expansion and lymphocyte function. Nature 408: 57-63, 2000
 Geddis AE, Kaushansky K. Endomitotic megakaryocytes form a midzone in anaphase but have a deficiency in cleavage furrow formation. Cell Cycle. 2006; 5:538-545
 Kaushansky K. Lineage specific hematopoietic growth factors. The New England Journal of Medicine 354:2034-2045, 2006
 Geron I, Abrahamsson A, Kavalerchik E, Barroga C, Gotlib J, Hood J, Soll R, Noronha G, Durocher J, Tefferi A, Kaushansky K, Jamieson C.  Selective inhibition of JAK2 driven erythroid differentiation potential of polycythemia vera progenitors. Cancer Cell, 2008; 13:321-330
 Hitchcock I, Chen M, Fox NE, Kaushansky K. YRRL motifs in the cytoplasmic domain of the thrombopoietin receptor regulate receptor internalization and degradation. Blood 2008 112:2222-2231
 Soda M, Willert K, Kaushansky K, Geddis A. Inhibition of GSK-3a promotes survival and proliferation of megakaryocytic cells through b-catenin-independent signaling. Cell Signal. 2008 20:2317-2323
 Kaushansky K: Thrombopoietin: Biological and preclinical properties. Leukemia 10:Suppl. S46-48, 1996
 Kaushansky K, Lok S:  The molecular and cellular biology of thrombopoietin, the MPL ligand.  In:  Molecular Basis of Thrombosis and Hemostatis.  KA High, HR Roberts (Eds.), Marcel Dekker, Inc., New York, NY pp. 651-662, 1995.
 Kaushansky K: In vitro predictions, in vivo realities. Platelets 8: 444–445, 1997.

References

1953 births
Living people
21st-century American physicians
American biochemists
American medical researchers
Canadian emigrants to the United States
American hematologists
Anglophone Quebec people
Canadian hematologists
Fellows of the American Academy of Arts and Sciences
Medical educators
Members of the National Academy of Medicine
Physicians from Montreal
Stony Brook University faculty
University of California, San Diego faculty
University of California, Los Angeles alumni
David Geffen School of Medicine at UCLA alumni
Presidents of the American Society of Hematology